This article provides details of international football games played by the Bangladesh national football team from 2000 to 2019.

Results

2000

2001

2003

2005

2006

2007

2008

2009

2010

2011

2012

2013

2014

2015

2016

2018

2019

References

2000
2000s in Bangladeshi sport
2010s in Bangladeshi sport